Conduit Head is a 1910 house located off the Madingley Road (A1303) on the western outskirts of Cambridge, England. Built in 1910, it was designed by Harry Redfern for Francis Darwin, and was built for Darwin's daughter Frances on the occasion of her marriage to F. M. Cornford. The architectural historians Simon Bradley and Nikolaus Pevsner describe the house as "gabled, rural and relaxed".

History 
The house was built in 1910 as a wedding gift from Francis Darwin (third son of Charles Darwin and Emma) to his daughter, Frances Crofts Darwin, for her marriage to Francis Cornford. It was designed by Harry Redfern and its name was carved by Eric Gill.

Conduit Head was owned by Sir Peter Lachmann (1931–2020), Sheila Joan Smith Professor of Immunology at the University of Cambridge and a fellow of Christ's College, and his wife Sylvia.

Name 
A conduit head, a square stone building of 3 m2, stands in the garden behind the house. It might be the original Trinity Head Conduit, constructed in 1327, which served as the main water supply for the Franciscan friary in the centre of Cambridge, Cambridge Greyfriars. Sidney Sussex College, Cambridge was founded on the site of the Greyfriars monastery.

The stone roof of the conduit head reveals the age of the structure. Its sloping roof is constructed with slabs that are fastened by iron pegs. Within the conduit head sits a 19th-century lead water tank.

The water from the conduit head used to flow into central Cambridge in wooden pipes that passed underneath the River Cam. Though the water was owned by the Franciscan friars, others would steal some of it along its route. Since the 16th century, the conduit head and the water has been owned by Trinity College, Cambridge. The supply was used to feed the fountain in the Great Court, built in 1601–2.

An archaeological dig several years back discovered a Roman settlement nearby with paths in the direction of the conduit head. It is believed that in Roman times and perhaps earlier this source of water was some sort of holy well that was used for ritual purposes

References 

Buildings and structures in Cambridge